Mian Rud (also Romanized as Mīān Rūd and Mīyān Rūd; also known as Meyārūd) is a village in Pol-e Doab Rural District, Zalian District, Shazand County, Markazi Province, Iran. At the 2006 census, its population was 180, in 43 families.

References 

Populated places in Shazand County